Dorukhan Engindeniz (born November 29, 1992) is a Turkish professional basketball player who plays as a Shooting guard for Petkim Spor of the Basketbol Süper Ligi (BSL).

References

External links
Dorukhan Engindeniz TBLStat.net Profile
Dorukhan Engindeniz Eurobasket Profile
Dorukhan Engindeniz TBL Profile

Living people
1992 births
Afyonkarahisar Belediyespor players
Bahçeşehir Koleji S.K. players
OGM Ormanspor players
Petkim Spor players
Shooting guards
Sportspeople from Ankara
Turkish men's basketball players
Türk Telekom B.K. players
21st-century Turkish people